is an old province of Japan in the area of Yamagata Prefecture (consisting mostly minus Akumi District). It was sometimes called , with Ugo Province.

This province was in the Tōhoku region of Honshū island. It was the place where the Mogami clan was established.

Historical districts 
 Yamagata Prefecture
 Tagawa District (田川郡)
 Higashitagawa District (東田川郡)
 Nishitagawa District (西田川郡) - dissolved
 Mogami District (最上郡)
 Murayama District (村山郡)
 Higashimurayama District (東村山郡)
 Kitamurayama District (北村山郡)
 Minamimurayama District (南村山郡) - dissolved
 Nishimurayama District (西村山郡)
 Okitama District (置賜郡)
 Higashiokitama District (東置賜郡)
 Minamiokitama District (南置賜郡) - dissolved
 Nishiokitama District (西置賜郡)

Notes

References
 Nussbaum, Louis-Frédéric and Käthe Roth. (2005).  Japan encyclopedia. Cambridge: Harvard University Press. ;  OCLC 58053128

Other websites

  Murdoch's map of provinces, 1903

Former provinces of Japan